Phao may refer to:

 Pháo (born 2003), Vietnamese rapper and producer
 Phao Siyanon (1910–1960), director general of Royal Thai Police
 Sapho and Phao, British Elizibethan era comedy stage play by John Lyly